Ruth Joyce Winder (born July 9, 1993) is a British-born American professional cyclist. In July 2021 Winder announced that she would retire from professional competition at the end of the season. During the 2021 UCI Road World Championships in Flanders, she was elected to a four-year term as a representative for road cycling on the Union Cycliste Internationale Athletes' Commission, winning 83 percent of the vote.

Major results

Road

2009
 National Junior Road Championships
1st  Road race
2nd Time trial
2012
 1st Tour of Somerville
 1st Cherry Pie Criterium
 2nd Johnson Health Grand Prix
2013
 1st Land Park Criterium
 8th Grand Prix GSB
 9th Grand Prix el Salvador
2015
 5th Overall Joe Martin Stage Race
1st  Young rider classification
 7th Road race, Pan American Games
2017
 1st  Overall Tour de Feminin-O cenu Českého Švýcarska
1st  Points classification
1st Stages 1 & 2
 1st  Overall Joe Martin Stage Race
1st Stages 1 (ITT), 2 & 4 
 1st  Overall Redlands Bicycle Classic
1st Stage 5
 1st Anniston McClellan Road Race
 2nd Overall Belgium Tour
 2nd Cadel Evans Great Ocean Road Race
 3rd Road race, National Road Championships
 3rd Overall North Star Grand Prix
1st Stages 3 & 5
 4th Overall Tour of the Gila
1st  Young rider classification
 5th Overall Tour of California
 8th Overall Women's Tour Down Under
 10th Overall Thüringen Rundfahrt der Frauen
2018
 1st Team time trial, Ladies Tour of Norway
 Giro Rosa
1st Stage 1 (TTT) & 5
Held  after Stage 5
 4th Overall Tour Cycliste Féminin International de l'Ardèche
1st  Points classification
1st Stages 3 & 6
 10th Road race, UCI Road World Championships
2019
 1st  Road race, National Road Championships
 1st Postnord UCI WWT Vårgårda West Sweden TTT
 1st Stage 1 Setmana Ciclista Valenciana
 6th Overall Belgium Tour
1st Prologue
 7th Overall Women's Herald Sun Tour
 8th Postnord UCI WWT Vårgårda West Sweden
 9th Cadel Evans Great Ocean Road Race
 9th GP de Plouay – Bretagne
 10th Overall Women's Tour Down Under
2020
 1st  Overall Women's Tour Down Under
1st Stage 3
 1st Stage 1 (TTT) Giro Rosa
 8th Cadel Evans Great Ocean Road Race
2021
 1st Brabantse Pijl
 Giro Rosa
1st Stage 1 (TTT)
Held  after Stage 1
 1st Stage 4 Tour Cycliste Féminin International de l'Ardèche
 2nd Donostia San Sebastián Klasikoa
 7th Overall Festival Elsy Jacobs
 7th La Flèche Wallonne
 10th Emakumeen Nafarroako Klasikoa

Track

2010
 National Track Championships
1st  Team pursuit
1st  Junior scratch
2011
 2nd Team pursuit, National Track Championships
2013
 1st  Team pursuit, Pan American Track Championships
 1st  Team pursuit, National Track Championships
 2nd Team pursuit, Los Angeles Grand Prix (with Kimberly Geist, Sarah Hammer and Jennifer Valente)
2015
 1st  Team pursuit, Pan American Track Championships (with Kelly Catlin, Sarah Hammer and Jennifer Valente) 
 2nd  Team pursuit, Pan American Games (with Kelly Catlin, Sarah Hammer, Lauren Tamayo and Jennifer Valente)
 2nd  Team pursuit, 2015–16 UCI Track Cycling World Cup, Cali
 3rd  Team pursuit, 2014–15 UCI Track Cycling World Cup, Cali
2016
 3rd  Team pursuit, 2015–16 UCI Track Cycling World Cup, Hong Kong

References

External links

Living people
American female cyclists
1993 births
Cyclists at the 2015 Pan American Games
Olympic cyclists of the United States
Cyclists at the 2016 Summer Olympics
Pan American Games medalists in cycling
Pan American Games silver medalists for the United States
Sportspeople from Keighley
Medalists at the 2015 Pan American Games
Cyclists at the 2020 Summer Olympics
21st-century American women
Cyclists from Yorkshire
English emigrants to the United States